Brattle is one of the settlements making up the dispersed village of Woodchurch in Kent, England. It is at the southern apex of the triangle of roads which are the main village.

Derivations
The surname Brattle is of geographical, place name origin. It was borne by one of the "Gentlemen's Families" living on estates in or near 18th century Boston, America (see Inman Square#History). After them are named Brattle Square and Brattle Street in neighbouring Cambridge, Massachusetts as well as Boston's Brattle Street. Derived, in turn, from these are the names of the Brattle Street Church in Boston and the Brattle Theatre in Cambridge.

Villages in Kent